Rolfing is a form of alternative medicine originally developed by Ida Rolf (1896–1979) as Structural Integration. 
Rolfing is marketed with unproven claims of various health benefits. It is based on Rolf's ideas about how the human body's "energy field" can benefit when aligned with the Earth's gravitational field.

Rolfing is typically delivered as a series of ten hands-on physical manipulation sessions sometimes called "the recipe". Practitioners combine superficial and deep manual therapy with movement prompts. The process is sometimes painful. The safety of Rolfing has not been confirmed.

The principles of Rolfing contradict established medical knowledge, and there is no good evidence Rolfing is effective for the treatment of any health condition. It is recognized as a pseudoscience and has been characterized as quackery.

Conceptual basis 
Science writer Edzard Ernst offers this definition: "Rolfing is a system of bodywork invented by Ida Pauline Rolf (1896–1979) employing deep manipulation of the body's soft tissue allegedly to realign and balance the body's myofascial structures."

Rolfing is based on the unproven belief that such alignment results in improved movement, breathing, pain reduction, stress reduction, and even emotional changes.

Rolf described the body as organized around an axis perpendicular to the earth, pulled downward by gravity, and she believed the function of the body was optimal when it was aligned with that pull. In her view, gravity tends to shorten fascia, leading to disorder of the body's arrangement around its axis and creating imbalance, inefficiency in movement, and pain. Rolfers aim to lengthen the fascia in order to restore the body's arrangement around its axis and facilitate improved movement. Rolf also discussed this in terms of "energy" and said:

Rolfers make a life study of relating bodies and their fields to the earth and its gravity field, and we so organize the body that the gravity field can reinforce the body's energy field. This is our primary concept.

The manipulation is sometimes referred to as a type of bodywork, or as a type of massage. Some osteopaths were influenced by Rolf, and some of her students became teachers of massage, including one of the founders of myofascial release.

Rolf claimed to have found an association between emotions and the soft tissue, writing "although rolfing is not primarily a psychotherapeutic approach to the problems of humans", it does constitute an "approach to the personality through the myofascial collagen components of the physical body". She claimed Rolfing could balance the mental and emotional aspects of subjects, and that "the amazing psychological changes that appeared in Rolfed individuals were completely unexpected". Rolfers suggest their manipulations can cause the release of painful repressed memories. Rolfers also hold that by manipulating the body they can bring about changes in personality; for example, teaching somebody to walk with confidence will make them a more confident person. The connection between physical structure and psychology has not been proven by scientific studies.

Technique 
Rolfers posit that they manipulate the body's fascial layers. Rolfing also uses a combination of active and passive movement retraining.

Rolfing is typically performed in a progression of 10 sessions, sometimes called "the recipe". The first three sessions of the protocol focus on superficial tissues, the next four focus on deeper tissues and specifically the pelvis, and the final sessions address the whole body.

A session typically lasts between 60 and 90 minutes. The recipient wears undergarments. Positions for the work include lying on a table, sitting, and standing.

Rolfing treatments are sometimes painful. For adults, there may be moments of intense sensation during a treatment or soreness afterward. However, the technique can be done gently enough for children and the elderly. Rolf believed fascia tightens as a protective mechanism, and therefore thought an aggressive approach could be counter-productive.

Effectiveness and reception 
Because of its dependence on vitalistic concepts and its unevidenced propositions about the connection between physical manipulation and psychology, Rolfing is classified as a pseudoscience, and its practice has been characterized as quackery.

Writing for Science-Based Medicine, lawyer Jann Bellamy writes that in the United States of America the public is inadequately protected from bodywork practices such as Rolfing because of the lack of independent oversight; instead regulation is carried out within a "closed loop" system by such bodies as the National Certification Board for Therapeutic Massage and Bodywork. In 2015 the Australian Government's Department of Health published a review of 17 alternative therapies, including Rolfing, which concluded no clear evidence of effectiveness was found. Accordingly, in 2017, the Australian government named Rolfing as a practice that would not qualify for insurance subsidy, to ensure the best use of insurance funds. Proponents of Rolfing claim it can be used to alleviate pain. However, Rolfing's focus on appropriate "alignment" of structures of the body does not reflect modern science about pain.

The American Cancer Society says the deep soft tissue manipulations such as those used in Rolfing are a concern if practiced on people with cancer near tumor sites.

In 2010 The New York Times reported that Rolfing was enjoying a "resurgence" following an endorsement from Mehmet Oz on The Oprah Winfrey Show.

In 2019 a taxonomy of "internet scams" identified Rolfing as having been used for deceptive claims about alleviating gastrointestinal problems by "restructuring" muscle tissue.

History 
Ida Rolf began working on clients in New York City in the 1940s with the premise that the human structure could be organized "in relation to gravity". She developed structural integration with one of her sons and by the 1950s she was teaching her work across the United States. In the mid-1960s she began teaching at Esalen Institute, where she gathered a loyal following of students and practitioners. Esalen was the epicenter of the Human Potential Movement, allowing Rolf to exchange ideas with many of their leaders, including Fritz Perls. Rolf incorporated a number of ideas from other areas including osteopathic manipulation, cranial osteopathy, hatha yoga, and the general semantics of Alfred Korzybski. In 1971 she founded the Rolf Institute of Structural Integration. The school has been based in Boulder, Colorado, since 1972, and as of 2010 included five institutes worldwide.

The Field of Structural Integration 
Since Rolf's death, the field of Structural Integration has branched into various schools. Of these schools, the Rolf Institute is the only one with the use of the trademarked terms "Rolfing" and "Certified Rolfer". Other programs of Structural Integration certify "Practitioners of the Rolf Method of Structural Integration" including the Guild for Structural Integration, Hellerwork Structural Integration, Aston Patterning, SOMA, KMI, and a dozen other Structural Integration programs. A professional membership organization exists called the International Association of Structural Integration, which has certified practitioners by exam since 2007.

In some states such as New Hampshire and Nevada, there is a separate license for SI. 
Internationally, some countries have a Board of Health that regulates bodywork while others don't. Four Canadian provinces require licensure for bodywork practitioners. Switzerland has separate licensure for complementary therapies including Structural Integration.

See also 
 Pierre Bernard (yogi) – an influence on Rolf

References

Further reading

External links
 Rolf Institute website

Alternative medical treatments
Manual therapy
Massage therapy
Pseudoscience
Somatics